Donald Livingstone (mathematician)
 Don Livingstone, politician
Donald Livingston, philosopher